Wehmeyer is a surname. Notable people with the surname include:

Bernd Wehmeyer (born 1952), German footballer
Berthold Wehmeyer (1925–1949), German murderer executed in West Berlin
Lewis Edgar Wehmeyer (1897–1971), American mycologist
Michael Wehmeyer (born 1957), American psychologist
Peggy Wehmeyer (born 1955), American journalist
Sharne Wehmeyer (born 1980), South African field hockey player

See also
Wehmeier